The Vossloh G400B is a B diesel-hydraulic shunting locomotive. The G400B is technically identical to the G322, except for some details like different final drives. It was renamed as G400B to fit in the new numbering scheme used in the 4th generation programme.

Operations
Vossloh built 6 stock locomotives for leasing, used by different operators. Four locomotives were eventually sold to leasing company northrail.

A second batch of 13 locomotives was built for Dutch train maintenance company NedTrain. These locomotives are slightly longer due to the fitting of extra coupling equipment, and are used to shunt trains around their workshops.

See also
VSFT G 322, same type but built before Vossloh's takeover.

References

G400B
Railway locomotives introduced in 2003
B locomotives
Diesel locomotives of the Netherlands
Standard gauge locomotives of the Netherlands

Shunting locomotives